Mahamadou Dembélé (born 10 April 1999) is a French professional footballer who plays as a defender for Belgian club Seraing.

Career

Red Bull Salzburg
In January 2019, he joined Fortuna Sittard on loan until the end of the season. In April 2019, Dembélé sustained a serious knee injury during training and returned to Salzburg.

Troyes
In August 2019, he joined Troyes AC from Red Bull Salzburg.

Seraing
On 7 September 2022, Dembélé signed a two-year contract with Seraing in Belgian Pro League.

Personal life
Born in France, Dembélé is of Malian descent.

References

External links

1999 births
Black French sportspeople
French sportspeople of Malian descent
People from Brétigny-sur-Orge
Footballers from Essonne
Living people
French footballers
France youth international footballers
Association football defenders
FC Liefering players
Fortuna Sittard players
ES Troyes AC players
Pau FC players
R.F.C. Seraing (1922) players
2. Liga (Austria) players
Eredivisie players
Ligue 2 players
Belgian Pro League players
French expatriate footballers
Expatriate footballers in Austria
French expatriate sportspeople in Austria
Expatriate footballers in the Netherlands
French expatriate sportspeople in the Netherlands
Expatriate footballers in Belgium
French expatriate sportspeople in Belgium